Rabbitville is an unincorporated community in Marion Township, Lawrence County, Indiana.

Rabbitville contained a post office from 1895 until 1897.

Geography

References

Unincorporated communities in Lawrence County, Indiana
Unincorporated communities in Indiana